The Guntur–Kacheguda AC Double Decker Express was a Superfast Double Decker train belonging to South Central Railway zone that used to run between  and  in India. It was operated with 22117/22118 train numbers on bi-weekly basis.

Service

The 22117/Guntur–Kacheguda AC Double Decker Express has an average speed of 56 km/hr and covers 287 km in 5h 10m. The 22118/Kacheguda–Guntur AC Double Decker Express has an average speed of 57 km/hr and covers 287 km in 5h 5m.

Route and halts 

The important halts of the train are:

Coach composition

The train has standard LHB rakes with max speed of 130 kmph. The train consists of 10 coaches:

 8 AC Chair Car (Double Decker)
 2 End-on Generator

Traction

Both trains are hauled by a Gooty Loco Shed-based WDM-3A diesel locomotive from Guntur to Hyderabad and vice versa.

Direction reversal

The train shares its rake with 22119/22120 Kacheguda–Tirupati Double Decker Express.

See also 

 Guntur Junction railway station
 Kacheguda railway station
 Kacheguda–Tirupati Double Decker Express

Notes

References

External links 

 22117/Guntur - Kacheguda AC Double Decker Express
 22118/Kacheguda – Guntur AC Double Decker Express

Transport in Guntur
Transport in Hyderabad, India
Double-decker trains of India
Rail transport in Andhra Pradesh
Rail transport in Telangana
Railway services introduced in 2014
Railway services discontinued in 2016
Defunct trains in India